Bessie Sudlow was the stage name of Barbara Eliza (Bessie) Johnstone (22 July 1849 – 28 January 1928), active in the United States as a burlesque performer from 1867 to 1874, then in Britain as an opera bouffe soprano from 1874 to 1880.

Life

Early years
Barbara Eliza (Bessie) Johnstone was born at 9 Bittern St in Liverpool, England on 22 July 1849. Her mother was Eliza, née Lee, from Ireland, and her father was George Johnstone, a qualified Master Mariner in the merchant navy. He died before the 1851 census. Eliza married Thomas Sudlow, also from Liverpool, in 1851 shortly after they moved to the United States, taking Bessie with them. Bessie's stepfather, Thomas Sudlow, was the stage-doorkeeper at Niblo's Garden in New York. Bessie joined a burlesque troupe, the "British Blondes", with the stage name of Bessie Sudlow. The troupe was led by Lydia Thompson, an English dancer, comedian, actress and producer.

Burlesque in the United States
The Evening Telegraph of Philadelphia, Pennsylvania on 17 November 1868 noted with approval in its review of The Lancashire Lass that "Miss Bessie Sudlow, who sustains the part of 'Fanny Danville' at the Chesnut, no longer affects a 'Grecian bend'." The "British Blondes" performed at the Tammany Grand Theatre in 1868–1869. Bessie performed in January 1869 in New York in the burlesque The Page's Revel. A lovely young woman at the age of 20, in 1869 Bessie was included in the cast of The Forty Thieves at Niblo's. In April and May 1869 she appeared in Robinson Crusoe and His Man Friday!. A review in The New York Times of 27 April 1869 listed Bessie among the singers. It was lukewarm, saying the pantomime-burlesque was "wrought out of tolerably old material ... [it] will be witnessed with greater pleasure when repeated rehearsals shall have smoothened it."

In December 1869 and January 1870 Bessie played at the Tammany Grand Theatre in a burlesque of Richard III called Bad Dickey. A review in the New York Clipper on 15 October 1870 said, "Miss Bessie Sudlow, serio-comic vocalist, has won golden opinions. Her rendition of Sweet Spirit Hear My Prayer and By Killarney’s Lakes and Vales is truly excellent." Bessie appeared on a regular basis from 1871 to 1873 in various extravaganzas at Niblo's, including two revivals of The Black Crook. She kept her connection to Lydia Thompson's troupe until she returned to England, but also performed in other productions.

Opera bouffe in Britain

Bessie returned to England and in September 1874 played with Lydia Thompson’s company in Blue Beard, a burlesque by Henry Brougham Farnie, at the Charing Cross Theatre in London. In January 1875 she performed at the Theatre Royal, Dublin in The Yellow Dwarf, a pantomime. The Era described her as "a very graceful and attractive actress and sings pleasingly". She appeared at the Gaiety Theatre, Dublin in March 1875 in The Isle of Bachelors, adapted from Charles Lecocq’s comic opera Les cent vierges. In June 1875 she performed in a promenade concert at the Theatre Royal, Dublin in honour of the American team taking part in an Irish–American International Rifle Match.

Bessie was in a company organized by Richard D'Oyly Carte that started a tour of England and Ireland on 21 June 1875. Carte's company performed La Périchole, La fille de Madame Angot, and Trial by Jury, by Gilbert and Sullivan. After ten weeks in England, the company opened at the Gaiety Theatre, Dublin on 5 September 1875. In October 1875 Bessie performed as an opera bouffe soprano, playing "Cesarine" in Charles Lecocq's Fleur-de-Thé. Emily Soldene recalled in her 1898 memoirs that D'Oyly Carte was producing this new comic opera at the Criterion Theatre. The actress playing "Caesarine" had to be replaced at the last minute, and Carte wired the Gaiety Theatre manager Michael Gunn to send Miss Sudlow from Dublin. She heard the music for the first time when she was on stage, and had to improvise where she had forgotten the words, but the reviewers were enthusiastic.

In January 1876, she performed at the Theatre Royal, Dublin in Dick Whittington and His Cat. According to The Era, "Her acting was as fresh as a daisy, and her sparkling vivacity and pleasant manner again won showers of applause and golden opinions". In March 1876, Bessie again went on tour with D'Oyly Carte's London Comic Opera Company, which again included La fille de Madame Angot in its repertoire. During rehearsals in Manchester, the two leading ladies, Pattie Laverne and Selina Dolaro, argued about the tempo of a duet. Eventually, Dolaro refused to play, and Carte called on Bessie to learn the role of Lange and play it at short notice. As an experienced professional, Bessie was known for her ability to learn a role quickly.
She was principal soprano for Richard D'Oyly Carte's Opera Bouffe Company on this tour from June to August 1876. On the tour, she played the Plaintiff in Trial by Jury, Amanda in Carte's Happy Hampstead, Müller in The Duke's Daughter, and Lange in La fille de Madame Angot.

Later years
When she was playing in the Gaiety Theatre, Dublin in September 1875, the manager, Michael Gunn, was attracted to Bessie. Gunn was a silent partner of Carte for several years. Carte was Michael Gunn's best man when he married Bessie on 26 October 1876 at the St Marylebone Parish Church, London. The bride was given away by George Dolby.{{efn|George Dolby, born in 1831, was a theatre manager and a close friend of Charles Dickens. He managed Dickens on successful reading tours in England and the United States. He died in 1900 in a paupers' hospital, the Fulham Parish Infirmary. After that, Bessie only performed on stage once more. They had six children, including Kevin (born in 1880), Brendan (born in 1881), Haidee Elizabeth (born 2 July 1882), Selskar (born in 1883), and Agnes. Haidée and Agnes both became actresses. Agnes later became later Lady Webb as wife of Sir Ambrose Henry Webb. Selskar Gunn became prominent as an expert in public health.

Gunn and Bessie had a house in Merrion Square, Dublin and another on Russell Square, London, both fine properties. They were one of the richest families in Dublin, and often held large gatherings at their house. Gunn was a close friend of John Stanislaus Joyce, father of James Joyce. The Joyces often visited the Gunns. James Joyce became a friend of their son Selskar. Gunn died at their London residence near Hampstead on 24 October 1901 at the age of 61. His estate was estimated at just over £20,000. Bessie became owner of the Gaiety when Gunn died, and held it until 1909.

Bessie Gunn died in Steyning, Sussex on 28 January 1928.

Notes

Citations

Sources

External links
 Photo of Sudlow

1849 births
1928 deaths
Burlesque performers
Sopranos